Dennis Malura (born 20 June 1984) is a German professional footballer who plays as a defender for 1. FC Solingen.

He is the son of Eddy Malura.

References

External links 
 

1984 births
Living people
Footballers from Berlin
German footballers
Association football defenders
2. Bundesliga players
3. Liga players
Regionalliga players
1. FC Union Solingen players
Wuppertaler SV players
Kickers Offenbach players
FC Rot-Weiß Erfurt players
TSV 1860 Munich players
1. FC Heidenheim players